Orlando Bernardo Ruff (born September 28, 1976, in Charleston, South Carolina) is a former American football player who played linebacker for the San Diego Chargers, New Orleans Saints and Cleveland Browns. In college, he played for Furman University, departing as the fourth ranking player in school history with 488 career tackles.

He was signed in 1999 as an undrafted free agent by the San Diego Chargers. While there, he was named Special Teams Player of the Year in 1999 and 2002), and was stout against the run as a starter during the 2000 and 2001 seasons. He departed in 2003 via free agency.

Ruff subsequently signed in the spring of 2003 with the New Orleans Saints. He remained there for two seasons as their middle linebacker. During his tenure in New Orleans, he finished second in overall tackles for two consecutive years.

He concluded his career in 2005 with the Cleveland Browns.

In his NFL career, Orlando played in 108 games. During that stint he finished with a total of 344 tackles, one sack and three interceptions.

1976 births
Living people
American football linebackers
Cleveland Browns players
Furman Paladins football players
San Diego Chargers players
New Orleans Saints players
Furman University alumni
Sportspeople from Charleston, South Carolina